Marlon Bernard Redmond (born April 15, 1955 in San Francisco, California) is a retired professional basketball shooting guard who played two seasons in the National Basketball Association (NBA) as a member of the Philadelphia 76ers (1978–79) and the Kansas City Kings (1978–80). He was drafted by the Golden State Warriors from the University of San Francisco during the third round of the 1977 NBA Draft.

External links

1955 births
Living people
American men's basketball players
Basketball players from San Francisco
Golden State Warriors draft picks
Kansas City Kings players
Philadelphia 76ers players
San Francisco Dons men's basketball players
Shooting guards